Steckerlfisch ("steckerl" means "small stick" or "pole" in the Bavarian dialect) is a fish grilled on a stick in the traditional way of a fisherman or camper. It is considered a speciality of Austria,  Bavaria, and Franconia. The dish is commonly served in beer garden and on folk festivals and has nothing to do with the dried Stockfish.

Traditionally it is prepared from local fish like coregonus or whitefish like common bream but nowadays trout, char or mackerel are also used.

Steckerlfisch is a very popular meal at the Munich Oktoberfest. It was the Oktoberfest which made the dish popular.  A local fish merchant introduced Steckerlfisch to the fair in the early part of the 20th century.

Preparation
The whole gutted fish are marinated in a hearty mixture of oil, spices and garlic and skewered on sticks of about 60 cm length. The sticks are then fixed in a way that the fish are positioned upside-down and angular next to the embers. During the process of grilling they are brushed a few times with the marinade so that the skin becomes crispy.

The Steckerlfisch is eaten on the paper in which it is wrapped after being grilled and served on a plate. Common side dishes are bread roll or pretzels.

References

External links
 
 Steckerlfisch images

Fish dishes
Bavarian cuisine
Austrian cuisine